Francesco "Frankie" Provenzano (born February 12, 1986 in Rome) is an Italian racing driver.

Career

Formula Renault
Provenzano began his formula racing career with the BVM Minardi team in Italian Formula Renault, finishing second to Jaime Alguersuari in the 2006 Winter Series – finishing three of the four races on the podium. This was after he failed to score any points in the main championship; his best finish was 13th at Spa. He also competed in two races of the 2006 Formula Renault Eurocup.

Formula 3000
Provenzano also competed in two races of the 2006 Euroseries 3000 championship, driving for a team backed by former Formula One entrants Coloni. He did not score any points, ending up with a tenth-place finish and a retirement in the two races at Vallelunga.

International Formula Master
Provenzano moved to the newly created International Formula Master series for 2007, driving for the ADM Motorsport team. He finished twentieth overall in that year, amassing seven points at the Brands Hatch meeting with a fifth and sixth. Provenzano did somewhat better in the concurrent Formula Master Italia championship by taking third place in the championship. He remained in the series for 2008, but could not improve on his previous 20th position in the championship.

A1 Grand Prix
Provenzano took part in the British round of the 2007–08 A1 Grand Prix season as a rookie driver for A1 Team Italy. This meant that he took part in an extra practice session prior to the event, before handing the car back to regular driver Edoardo Piscopo for the remainder of the weekend.

GP2 Series
Over the winter of 2008–2009, Provenzano was signed by the Trident Racing team to compete in the third round of the 2008–09 GP2 Asia Series season. He replaced previous incumbent Alberto Valerio in the seat, and has been partnered by Adrián Vallés, who also made his début for Trident at the same time. Provenzano was himself replaced by Ricardo Teixeira after four races.

World Series by Renault
Provenzano was then signed by Prema Powerteam for a 2009 campaign in the World Series by Renault, partnering Omar Leal. However, he left the team after the second round, and returned to International Formula Master.

Racing record

Career summary

Complete Formula Renault 3.5 Series results
(key) (Races in bold indicate pole position) (Races in italics indicate fastest lap)

Complete GP2 Asia series results
(key) (Races in bold indicate pole position) (Races in italics indicate fastest lap)

References

External links
Frankie Provenzano career details at driverdb.com
A1 Grand Prix announcement concerning Provenzano's participation as a rookie driver

1986 births
Living people
Italian racing drivers
Italian Formula Renault 2.0 drivers
Formula Renault Eurocup drivers
Auto GP drivers
A1 Grand Prix Rookie drivers
International Formula Master drivers
GP2 Asia Series drivers
World Series Formula V8 3.5 drivers
Trident Racing drivers
Prema Powerteam drivers
BVM Racing drivers
Scuderia Coloni drivers
Cram Competition drivers